Baresa may refer to:

 Baresa, a village of Northern Red Sea Region (Eritrea) 
 Biaroza (in Russian Berëza), a town of Brest Voblast (Belarus)